is a Japanese animation studio based in Suginami-ku. It was founded by ADK Emotions in June 2019.

History
Studio Kai was founded by ADK Emotions in June 2019. In July 2019, Gonzo transferred some of its anime production, intellectual property, and rights management business to the studio. The studio reported 165 million yen loss in 2020.

Works

Television series

Original net animations

OVAs
Hori-san to Miyamura-kun (2021, episode 6)

References

External links
Official website 

Animation studios in Tokyo
Japanese animation studios
Japanese companies established in 2019
Mass media companies established in 2019
Suginami